VR – Crushing the World is a DVD compilation by American heavy metal band Vicious Rumors, released in 2005. It contains several live performances, backstage clips, the MTV-era videos produced by Gore Verbinski, and three (at the time) new/unreleased songs.

Contents
"Down to the Temple"
"On the Edge"
"Digital Dictator"
"Poveglia"*
"March or Die"
"Fight"*
"You Only Live Twice"
"Don't Wait for Me"
"Lady Took a Chance"
"Broken Wings"*
"Abandoned"
"Against the Grain"
"Children"
"Don't Wait for Me"
"The Voice"
*Previously unreleased material.

Personnel
 Geoff Thorpe: guitars 
 Mark McGee: guitars 
 Vinnie Moore: guitars 
 Ira Black: guitars 
 Brian O'Connor: vocals 
 Carl Albert: vocals  
 Dave Starr: bass 
 Tommy Sisco: bass 
 Cornbread: bass 
 Larry Howe: drums 
 Will Carroll: drums
 Dan Lawson: drums
 Allyson Erick: "Rockumentary" director
 Karl Fredrick Anderson II: Rockumentary producer, Global Recording Artists
 Allyson Erick: Rockumentary producer, Global Recording Artists

References

2005 video albums
Vicious Rumors video albums
2005 live albums
Live video albums